Gerbrand van den Eeckhout (19 August 1621 – 29 September 1674) was a Dutch Golden Age painter and a favourite student of Rembrandt. He was also an etcher, an amateur poet, a collector and an adviser on art.

Biography
Gerbrand was born in Amsterdam, the son of a jeweller, a Mennonite who fled after 1585 from Antwerp to the north. In 1631 his mother died. His father's second wife was Cornelia Dedel, the daughter of a founder of the Delft chamber of the Dutch East India Company.

Arnold Houbraken records Van den Eeckhout was a pupil of Rembrandt. A fellow pupil to Ferdinand Bol, Nicolaes Maes and Govert Flinck,  but regarded as inferior to them in skill and experience; he soon assumed Rembrandt's manner with such success that his pictures were confused with those of his master.

Eeckhout does not merely copy the subjects; he also takes the shapes, the figures, the Jewish dress and the pictorial effects of his master. It is difficult to form an exact judgment of Eeckhout's qualities at the outset of his career. His earliest pieces are probably those in which he more faithfully reproduced Rembrandt's peculiarities. Exclusively his is a tinge of green in shadows marring the harmony of the work, a gaudiness of jarring tints, uniform surface and a touch more quick than subtle.

Eeckhout matriculated early in the Gild of Amsterdam. As he grew older Eeckhout succeeded best in portraits, for example that of Isaac Commelin (formerly identified as a portrait of   the historian Olfert Dapper (1669)), in the Städel collection in Frankfurt. Eeckhout occasionally varied his style. He followed Gerard ter Borch in Gambling Soldiers, at Stafford House, and a Soldiers' Merrymaking, in the collection of the marquess of Bute. Amongst the best of Eeckhout's works are Christ in the Temple (1662), at Munich, and the Haman and Mordecai of 1665, at Luton House.

Eeckhout, unmarried, was also appreciated as art connoisseur, and dealing with poets and scientists. At the end of his life he was living with his sister-in-law, a widow, on Herengracht, at a very prestigious part of the canal.  He died in Amsterdam.

Works
The Continence of Scipio, Rijksmuseum Amsterdam 
Isaac Blessing Jacob, in the Metropolitan Museum of Art
Resurrection of the Daughter of Jairus, in the Berlin museum
Presentation in the Temple, in the Dresden gallery
Presentation in the Temple, at Berlin
Giving a Tenth, at Museum of Yugoslav History in Belgrade
Tobit with the Angel, at Brunswick
Woman taken in Adultery, at Amsterdam
Anna presenting her Son to the High Priest, in the Louvre
 Epiphany, at Turin
 Circumcision, at Kassel
 A likeness of a lady at a dressingtable with a string of beads, at Vienna
 Sportsman with Hounds, in the Van der Hoo gallery (?)
 Group of Children with Goats in the Hermitage
 Vision of Cornelius the Centurion, at The Walters Art Museum

References

Attribution:

External links

 Eeckhout the Rijksmuseum
 Works and literature at PubHist
Vermeer and The Delft School, an exhibition catalog from The Metropolitan Museum of Art (fully available online as PDF), which has material on Gerbrand van den Eeckhout
Dutch and Flemish paintings from the Hermitage, an exhibition catalog from The Metropolitan Museum of Art (fully available online as PDF), which contains material on Gerbrand van den Eeckhout (cat. no. 8)

1621 births
1674 deaths
Dutch Golden Age painters
Dutch male painters
Painters from Amsterdam
Dutch etchers
Pupils of Rembrandt